Thomas Day may refer to:

Sports
 Tom Day (rugby union) (1907–1980), Welsh rugby union player
 Tom Day (American football) (1935–2000), American football player
 Tom Day (footballer) (born 1997), English footballer

Others
 Thomas Day (writer) (1748–1789), British author and abolitionist
 Thomas Day (musician), 17th-century English choirmaster
 Thomas Day (pirate), English pirate and privateer active off New England
 Thomas Day (Connecticut judge) (1777–1855), American lawyer, judge, and legal scholar
 Thomas Day (cabinetmaker) (1801–1861), African-American furniture designer and cabinetmaker
 Thomas B. Day (1932–2021), American college president and physicist
 Thomas Fleming Day (1861–1927), British-born American sailboat designer/racer and magazine editor
 Thomas Cuthbert Day (1852–1935), British chemist, photo-engraver and geologist

See also
 Tom Dey (born 1965), American filmmaker
 Day (surname)